Polk may refer to the following people:
Given name
Polk, a Paiute (Native American) chief (see Bluff War)
Polk Laffoon (1844–1906), American lawyer and U.S. Representative from Kentucky
Polk Miller (c. 1840–1913), American pharmacist, musician, and Confederate soldier
Polk Robison (1912–2008), American collegiate basketball and football coach and athletics administrator

Surname
Albert Fawcett Polk (1869–1955), American lawyer and United States representative from Delaware 
Antoinette Polk, Baroness de Charette (1847–1919), American Southern belle and French aristocrat by marriage 
Aysia Polk (born 1990), American actress
Benjamin Polk (1916–2001), American designer and architect
Carlos Polk (born 1977), American retired National Football League player
Charles Polk, Jr. (1788–1857), American farmer and politician
Chris Polk (born 1989), American football running back
DaShon Polk (born 1977), American football player
Doug Polk (born 1988), American professional poker player
Elias Polk (1806–1886), American slave and political activist
Ezekiel Polk (1747–1824), American surveyor, soldier, pioneer and grandfather to United States president James K. Polk
Frank Polk (1871–1943), American lawyer
George Polk (1913–1948), American journalist murdered in Greece
Grace Porterfield Polk (1875–1965), American singer, songwriter, composer, clubwoman
Hiram Polk (born 1936), American surgeon and thoroughbred horse racing enthusiast
James G. Polk (1896–1959), United States representative from Ohio
James H. Polk (1911–1992), American four-star general 
James K. Polk (1795–1849), 11th president of the United States of America
Leonidas Polk (1806–1864), American bishop, Confederate general, planter, related to U.S. president James K. Polk
Leonidas Lafayette Polk (1837–1892), American farmer, journalist and political figure
Lucius Junius Polk (1802–1870), American politician and planter from Tennessee.
Lucy Ann Polk (1927–2011), American jazz singer
Makai Polk (born 2001), American football player
Oscar Polk (1899–1949), American actor
Ron Polk (born 1944), American college baseball coach
Rufus King Polk (1866–1902), United States representative from Pennsylvania
Sarah Childress Polk (1803–1891), wife of James K. Polk
Shawntinice Polk (1983–2005), American basketball player
Susan Polk (born 1957), American murderer
Tori Polk (born 1983), American long jumper
Trusten Polk (1811–1876), American governor, Confederate Army officer, and United States senator
Vanleer Polk (1858–1907), American politician from Tennessee
William Benjamin Polk (1930–2014), Illinois state representative
William Hawkins Polk (1815–1862), Tennessee congressman 
William R. Polk (1929–2020), foreign policy consultant, author 
William Polk (colonel) (1758–1834), American Revolutionary War officer and bank president 
Willis Polk (1867–1924), American architect best known for his work in San Francisco, California